The Helsinki City Rail Loop ( literally translated: droplet railway) is a planned new railway line in Helsinki, Southern Finland. It is to be a double track balloon loop in the shape of a tear drop. Helsinki commuter rail currently terminating at Helsinki Central railway station would be diverted into tunnels under the city centre. New underground stations would be created in Töölö (west), Helsinki city centre (south; likely to be located directly under Forum shopping centre) and Hakaniemi metro station (east), with a possible fourth station at Alppila (north) depending on how the connection to the main line is made in relation to the existing northern Pasila railway station.

The target is to free up capacity at Helsinki Central railway station to allow for expansion of long-distance trains; the existing capacity between Pasila and Helsinki has been all used up with the opening of the Ring Rail Line in 2014. Detailed planning took place during 2012–2015, resulting in the project being shelved in February 2015. The project was initially expected to cost €956 million if completed by the 2020s. For the planning stages, €40 million was allocated. By 2019 the expected cost of the original plan had risen to €1.5 billion.

In June 2022, the Finnish Transport Infrastructure Agency (FTIA) published a report stating that the City Rail Loop is not necessary, and suggested alternatives such as renewal of commuter train fleets and improved railway signalling. Individual changes in gear and geometry are also needed in the railway area of the Central railway station and Pasila. However, the study has looked at a situation in which the City Rail Loop, Lentorata, the new direct line between Riihimäki and Tampere and the Helsinki–Turku high-speed railway would have been implemented.

See also
 Ring Rail Line
 Helsinki to Tallinn Tunnel

References

External links
City Rail Loop (Finnish Transport Agency)

Railway lines in Finland
Transport in Helsinki
5 ft gauge railways in Finland
Proposed railway lines in Finland
Railway tunnels in Finland
Underground commuter rail